Shaanxiana is a butterfly genus in the family Lycaenidae. It is monotypic, containing only the species Shaanxiana takashimai which is found in Shaanxi, China. Shaanxiana takashimai contains the subspecies S. t. pauper Sugiyama, 1994 from Mount Siguniang, Sichuan

References

Theclini
Monotypic butterfly genera
Lycaenidae genera